Société des Avions Bernard was a French aircraft manufacturer of the early 20th century.

History
The company was founded in April 1917 by Adolphe Bernard as Etablissements Adolphe Bernard to licence-built SPAD fighters. Immediately after the war the company was reorganised as Société Industrielle des Métaux et du Bois ("SIMB") to cover a wider product range.  It built no new aircraft until 1922, when an aircraft division was formed with Jean Hubert as head designer. The company was bankrupt in 1927.

Bernard re-formed it a last time under the name Société des Avions Bernard to build a small production run of airliners for CIDNA. In 1935, Hydravions Louis Schreck FBA was purchased. However, the business was struggling again before the French aviation industry was nationalised in 1935.

Aircraft
The list shows those types which were at least partially built. Data and naming style from Liron (1990).

Etablissements Adolphe Bernard
 Bernard AB 1 Twin engine medium bomber. 11 built. 1918. The AB 2 was a proposed higher power version.
 Bernard AB 3 Post carrying version of AB 1, 1920. 
 Bernard AB 4 Unfinished passenger version of AB 2, exhibited 1919.
Société Industrielle des Métaux et du Bois (S.I.M.B.)
 Bernard AB.C1 Fighter, 1922 redesignated AB 10 before first flight.
 Bernard SIMB AB 3M Twin-fuselage, three-engine bomber. Two unfinished, 1923. The AB 3 T was a proposed civil version.
 Bernard SIMB V.1 Racer. One built, 1924.
 Bernard SIMB V.2 V.1 with shorter span. One built, 1924. The V.3 was a proposed development with retractable undercarriage. 
 Bernard SIMB AB 10 Revision of AB.C1, 1924.
 Bernard SIMB AB 10T Three-engined, eighteen-seat seaplane, unfinished, 1925.
 Bernard SIMB AB 12 Fighter. One built, 1926.
 Bernard SIMB AB 14 Fighter. One built, 1925.
 Bernard SIMB AB 15 Fighter. One built, 1926.
 Bernard SIMB AB 16 Three-engine, five-seat "colonial" type. One built, 1927.
Société des Avions Bernard (S.A.B.)
 Bernard 18 Eight-seat transports. Two built, 1927
 Bernard 190 Ten-seat transports, Fourteen built, 1928.
 Bernard 20 Single-seat fighter. One built, 1929.

 Bernard 30 T Twin-fuselage transport. Unfinished 1931.
 Bernard HV 40 Single-seat racing floatplane.  One built 1929.
 Bernard HV 41 Single-seat racing floatplane.  One built 1929.
 Bernard HV 42 Single-seat racing training floatplane. Three built, one converted from HV 41, 1931.
 Bernard H 52 Single-seat catapult launched floatplane fighter. Two built, 1933.
 Bernard 60 T Three-engine fourteen-seat transport.  Two built, 1929.
 Bernard 70 Series of single-seat, single-engine sports and fighters. Three built, 1929.
 Bernard 80 GR Long-range record holder. One built, 1930. Modified into 81 GR.
 Bernard 82 Bomber variants of Bernard 80. Two built, 1933. The Bernard 86 was an experimental diesel powered modification, 1936.
 Bernard H 110 Single-seat floatplane fighter. One built, 1935.
 Bernard HV 120 Single-seat racing floatplane. Two built, 1930. 
 Bernard 160 Colonial military multi-role aircraft.  Two built, 1932.
 Bernard 200 Series of three/four-seat light aircraft. Four built, 1932.
 Bernard HV 220 Single-seat racing floatplane. One built, 1931.
 Bernard 260 Single-seat fighter. Two built, one flown, 1932.
 Bernard HV 320 Single-seat racing seaplane. Not flown, 1931.
 Bernard V.4 Derivative of HV 120. Not flown, 1933.

See also
List of aircraft manufacturers

References

 
 

Defunct aircraft manufacturers of France
Vehicle manufacturing companies established in 1917
Vehicle manufacturing companies disestablished in 1935
Defunct manufacturing companies of France
Defence companies of France
1917 establishments in France
1935 disestablishments in France
Companies based in Île-de-France